Grady Hendrix is an American author, journalist, public speaker, and screenwriter known for his best-selling 2014 novel Horrorstör. Hendrix lives in Manhattan and was one of the founders of the New York Asian Film Festival.

Life and career
Hendrix was born in South Carolina. His parents divorced when he was 13 years old and the author spent much of his time in public libraries. As an adult Hendrix worked in the library of the American Society for Psychical Research before turning to professional writing. Alongside his novels, he has written for numerous media outlets, including Playboy Magazine, The New York Post, and, prior to its closure in 2008, as a film critic for The New York Sun.

In 2009, Hendrix attended the Clarion Workshop at the University of California at San Diego.

He has also contributed to Katie Crouch's young adult series The Magnolia League, and his fiction has appeared in Strange Horizons and Pseudopod.

In 2012, Hendrix co-wrote Dirt Candy: A Cookbook, a graphic novel/cookbook/memoir with his wife Amanda Cohen and Ryan Dunlavey. In 2014, Quirk Books published his novel, Horrorstör, which was subsequently optioned for a television series by FOX. Grady then wrote My Best Friend's Exorcism (2016) and the acclaimed non-fiction study Paperbacks from Hell: The Twisted History of ’70s and ’80s Horror Fiction (2017). He also co-wrote the 2017 motion picture Mohawk with director Ted Geoghegan and the spec script for the horror comedy film Satanic Panic, which was acquired and produced by Fangoria during mid 2018. My Best Friend's Exorcism and Horrorstör, have been optioned for film adaptations, while The Southern Book Club's Guide to Slaying Vampires and The Final Girl Support Group are slated for television adaptations. Hendrix created a one-man show for The Final Girl Support Group to promote the novel, as he found traditional author events boring.

From May 2020 to October 2020, Hendrix has also hosted his own podcast called Super Scary Haunted Homeschool, that talked about the history of vampires to promote his book The Southern Book Club's Guide to Slaying Vampires.

Bibliography

Books
Occupy Space (2012) (Out of print)
Satan Loves You (2012) (Out of print)
Dirt Candy: A Cookbook (2012, with Amanda Cohen and Ryan Dunlavey)
Li'l Wimmin: A Comic Adaptation of Louisa May Alcott's Little Women (2013, with Ryan Dunlavey)
The White Glove War (2013, The Magnolia League #2, with Katie Crouch)
The Mad Scientist's Guide to World Domination: Original Short Fiction for the Modern Evil Genius (2013, contributor)
Horrorstör (2014, Quirk Books)
My Best Friend's Exorcism (2016, Quirk Books)
Paperbacks from Hell: The Twisted History of ’70s and ’80s Horror Fiction (2017, Quirk Books)
We Sold Our Souls (2018, Quirk Books)
The Southern Book Club's Guide to Slaying Vampires (2020, Quirk Books)
The Final Girl Support Group (2021, Berkley)
These Fists Break Bricks: How Kung Fu Movies Swept America and Changed the World (2021, Mondo Books)
Badasstronauts (2022, Jab Books)
How to Sell a Haunted House (2023, Berkley)

Screenplays 

 Mohawk (2017, with Ted Geoghegan)
 Satanic Panic (2019)
 The Black Room (TBA)
 Horrorstör (TBA)

Short story collections
 Dead Leprechauns & Devil Cats: Strange Tales of the White Street Society (2020, JABberwocky Literary Agency)

Awards
 Bram Stoker Award for Best Non-Fiction (2018, for Paperbacks from Hell)

References

External links
 

21st-century American novelists
American horror novelists
American horror writers
American male novelists
American male screenwriters
Novelists from South Carolina
People from South Carolina
Writers from Charleston, South Carolina
Year of birth missing (living people)
Living people
21st-century American screenwriters
21st-century American male writers